Vincent O'Kane (born 20 November 1952) is an English former professional footballer who played as a midfielder in the Football League for Charlton Athletic. He also played non-league football for clubs including Kettering Town and Chelmsford City.

References

1959 births
Living people
English footballers
Association football midfielders
Footballers from Stepney
Charlton Athletic F.C. players
Kettering Town F.C. players
Chelmsford City F.C. players
English Football League players